Laurent François (born 6 May 1968) is a French retired wheelchair fencer who competed at international fencing competitions. He was a Paralympic champion in the foil. He is also a double World champion and double European champion in the sabre.

References

1968 births
Living people
Paralympic wheelchair fencers of France
Wheelchair fencers at the 2008 Summer Paralympics
Wheelchair fencers at the 2012 Summer Paralympics
Medalists at the 2008 Summer Paralympics